Steganacaridae is a family of mites in the order Oribatida.

Genera
 Austrophthiracarus
 Hoplophthiracarus
 Notophthiracarus

References

Sarcoptiformes
Acari families